Harry Chapin: When in Doubt, Do Something is a 2020 documentary-biographical film directed by Rick Korn documenting the life and career of Harry Chapin.

Background
The film covers Chapin's life, career and political activism. It is told through interviews, archive footage, and photos. The film features testimonials from Chapin's family, band members, and peers that include Billy Joel, Pat Benatar, Kenny Rogers, Bruce Springsteen, and more.

Cast

 Harry Chapin
 Bruce Springsteen
 Pete Seeger
 Kenny Rogers
 Pat Benatar
 Bob Geldoff
 Ken Kragen
 John Wallace
 Bill Ayres
 Robert Lamm
 Darryl McDaniels

References

External links
 

2020 films
2020 documentary films
Rockumentaries
Documentary films about singers
2020s English-language films